Mildirn, sometimes spelt Medlone, also known as Jack Davis, Old Jack Davis or Port Essington Jack (c. 1835–c. 1914) was a well-known Aboriginal leader, translator and advisor for Port Essington, a site of early British settlement in the Northern Territory of Australia.

Life in Port Essington

Mildirn was born c. 1835 near the Cobourg Peninsula. He was four years old when the Port Essington garrison was established and he became ‘something of a pet with the regiment’. He was a messenger for the officers and was well known for ‘giving vent to the most horrible blasphemies and obscenities’ which he had learnt from the soldiers. He became a well-known point of contact for any matters pertaining to Port Essington, advising visitors to the area and managing relations with his tribe.

Work on merchant ships

In 1847, at the age of twelve, Mildirn was taken to Hong Kong on a merchant ship with two other young boys, Mijok and Aladyin. He was left stranded after the master of the ship died, but was recognised by Crawford Pasco, an officer who had served at Port Essington, and organised the boys' return to Port Essington. Pasco received correspondence from Captain MacArthur advising him that Mildirn had arrived safely to Port Essington. One of the other boys died. Port Essington was abandoned shortly after his return, in 1849.

Between the years of 1850–70, Mildirn crewed on a merchant ship for a number of years. In this time he became a fluent speaker of English and it was in this period that he acquired the name ‘Jack Davis’. He was away so long that he was assumed dead by his people. When he returned he was not recognised. He had to prove his identity and relearn some of the local language.

Mildirn's son, Nanyenya was taken to Adelaide by John Lewis, who ran a buffalo enterprise near Port Essington. A popular but troublesome boy, he became 'too much for the people of Adelaide'. After jumping ship to Queensland, he returned to Adelaide where he fell ill and died.

Later life

Mildirn lived to over 90 years of age and was the oldest person in the Northern Territory at the time. He was described in 1914, as "a stooping, sightless old blackfellow, the last of his race". Despite his old age, he was still able to tell stories of Port Essington, the last living person who witnessed this chapter in Australian history. He could still name the officers and mimic the voice of the drill sergeant.

References

1914 deaths
1835 births
People from the Northern Territory